The first season of American reality dance competition World of Dance premiered May 30, 2017, on NBC. Jennifer Lopez, Ne-Yo, and Derek Hough served as the judges, with Jenna Dewan serving as host. Hip hop dancers Les Twins, from Paris, France, were crowned as the winners of the $1,000,000 prize on August 8, 2017. Fourteen-year-old contemporary dancer Eva Igo and Latin/Swing group Swing Latino were named first runner-up and second runner-up respectively.

Dancers

Junior (under 18)

Upper (18 and over, up to 4 members)

Team (18 and over, 5–15 members)

 Despite their Qualifier performance not being shown, this act's hometown and dance style were made available on the World of Dance website. Therefore, these acts do not have a determined average score.

 MiniRequest, Kings Unite & Rhythmatic were the only groups not to have a full performance featured during their time on the show.

Qualifiers
In each round of the Qualifiers, the dance acts will perform a 2-minute routine in front of the judges and a live audience. They will be scored by the judges in 5 categories: Performance, Technique, Choreography, Creativity & Presentation. Each category is worth 20 points with a perfect score of 100. For the dance act to progress forward, they must receive an average score of 80 or higher.

Color key:

Part 1: May 30

Part 2: June 6

Part 3: June 13

The Duels
In each round of The Duels, two acts in the same division compete for a spot in the next round. In each division, the acts with the top qualifying scores choose their opponents, then both acts perform back-to-back, receiving feedback from the judges. After each performance, the judges will score them in the 5 categories: Performance, Technique, Creativity, Choreography & Presentation. Unlike the Qualifiers, only the final average for each act is shown. The act with the highest average at the end of the duel moves on to the next round, the other faces immediate elimination.

The Cut
In The Cut, the 15 remaining acts compete for two spots in each of their divisions. As each dance act competes, their final score is displayed on a leaderboard for their division. Once a dance act's score falls out of the top 2, they face immediate elimination. For this round, each of the judges became mentors for one of the divisions; Jennifer worked with the Juniors, Derek worked with the Upper acts and Ne-Yo worked with the Teams. Guest judge Misty Copeland joined the panel for this segment.

Divisional Final
In the Divisional Final, the 2 remaining acts in each division square off, with only one act going to the World Final to represent their division. Continuing from the previous round, each of the 3 judges acted as mentors for the divisions; Jennifer worked with the Teams, Ne-Yo worked with the Upper acts and Derek worked with the Juniors. Keone and Mari were awarded the first and only 100 score of the entire season by Ne-Yo during the Divisional Final.

World Final
In the World Final, the final 3 acts competed head to head to win the one million dollar prize. As with the previous 2 rounds, the judges became mentors for each of the finalists; Jennifer worked with Les Twins, Derek worked with Swing Latino and Ne-Yo worked with Eva. Each of the 3 finalists performed twice; The first performance's music was chosen by one of the judges and the second was chosen by the finalist. After each performance, the final scores were displayed on a leaderboard. The winner of the World Finals was determined by the judges combined average scores from both performances. After the final performances, Les Twins were announced as the winners of World of Dance; their final combined score of 93.8 just barely edged out Eva Igo by 0.1 points.

Final Scores
Les Twins (93.8)

Eva Igo (93.7)

Swing Latino (93.2)

Contestants who appeared on other shows
 Several members of various dance acts have competed on the US version of So You Think You Can Dance. Nick Young, founder of Rhythmatic, competed on Season 8, making the Top 20. Audrey Case of Royal Flux competed on Season 9, making the Top 10. Du-Shaunt "Fik-Shun" Stegall is the male winner of Season 10. Diana Pombo auditioned for Season 13, getting cut in the callbacks.
 Denys Drozdyuk of DNA is the winner of Season 3 of So You Think You Can Dance Canada. DNA also auditioned for the US version in Season 12, where both were eliminated in the callbacks.
 Les Twins competed on Season 3 of Incroyable Talent.
 Jabbawockeez debuted on Season 2 of America's Got Talent. They were eliminated in the Las Vegas callbacks.
 Jabbawockeez & Super Cr3w have competed and won their respective seasons of America's Best Dance Crew. JabbaWockeez won Season 1 and Super Cr3w won Season 2.
 Kinjaz & Super Cr3w both competed on Season 8 of America's Best Dance Crew, reaching the finals (placing 2nd and 3rd respectively).
 Ian Eastwood of Ian Eastwood and the Young Lions competed as a member of Mos Wanted Crew on Season 7 of America's Best Dance Crew
D'Angelo and Amanda appeared on Season 8 of America's Got Talent. They were eliminated after reaching the Top 12. Amanda also competed in Abby's Ultimate Dance Competition season 1 placing 4th.
Nick Daniels appeared on Dance Moms as a part of the candy apples team.

Highest Scoring Dances

Ratings

References

External links

2017 American television seasons